Dmitry Lukyanov (born 9 March 1993) is a Kazakhstani professional racing cyclist. He rode in the men's team time trial at the 2015 UCI Road World Championships, and finished second at the 2015 Kazakhstan National Road Race Championships and its under-23 equivalent.

References

External links

1993 births
Living people
Kazakhstani male cyclists
Place of birth missing (living people)
20th-century Kazakhstani people
21st-century Kazakhstani people